Victor and Victoria is a 1933 German musical comedy film written and directed by Reinhold Schünzel, starring Renate Müller as a woman pretending to be a female impersonator. The following year, Schünzel directed a French-language version of the film titled George and Georgette, starring Meg Lemonnier and a French cast.

In 1935, Michael Balcon produced an English version titled First a Girl, directed by Victor Saville and starring Jessie Matthews and Sonnie Hale. A West German remake by Karl Anton was released in 1957.

In 1982, Metro-Goldwyn-Mayer released Victor/Victoria, an English-language remake by Blake Edwards. Edwards later based a successful stage musical on the film. Both the film and the musical starred Julie Andrews.

Cast
 Renate Müller as Susanne / Monsieur Victoria
 Hermann Thimig as Viktor Hempel
 Anton Walbrook as Robert
 Hilde Hildebrand as Ellinor
 Fritz Odemar as Douglas
 Friedel Pisetta as Lilian
 Aribert Wäscher as F. A. Punkertin, Victoria's agent

Remakes 
 1935: First a Girl (UK)
 1957: Victor and Victoria (Germany)
 1975: My Girlfriend, the Transvestite (Argentina)
 1982: Victor/Victoria (UK/US)
 1995: Victor/Victoria'' (TV, US)

See also 
 List of films made in Weimar Germany

External links 
 
 
 Rick Thompson in Senses of Cinema
 Viktor und Viktoria at Virtual History

1933 films
1933 multilingual films
1933 musical comedy films
1930s German films
1930s German-language films
1930s LGBT-related films
Drag (clothing)-related films
Films about trans men
Films directed by Reinhold Schünzel
Films of Nazi Germany
Films of the Weimar Republic
German black-and-white films
German LGBT-related films
German multilingual films
German musical comedy films
LGBT-related musical comedy films
UFA GmbH films